Rastislavice is a village and municipality in the Nové Zámky District in the Nitra Region of south-west Slovakia.

History
The village is new built in 1936.

Geography
The village lies at an altitude of 124 metres and covers an area of 19.589 km². It has a population of about 920 people.

Ethnicity
  Slovaks 99%
  Hungarians 1%

Facilities
The village has a public library and a football pitch.

External links
 
 
http://www.statistics.sk/mosmis/eng/run.html
Rastislavice – Nové Zámky Okolie

official web site of the village:
 https://web.archive.org/web/20070225010601/http://www.rastislavice.ocu.sk/

Villages and municipalities in Nové Zámky District